Spring Valley is a long north south trending basin, largely in White Pine County, Nevada and a small portion in the extreme south in Lincoln County, Nevada.

References

Valleys of Nevada
Valleys of Lincoln County, Nevada
Valleys of White Pine County, Nevada
Valleys of the Great Basin